The Bangabandhu Cup 2023 International Kabaddi Tournament is an International Kabaddi Tournament organised by Bangladesh Kabaddi Federation in Bangladesh. The third season of Bangabandhu Cup (Kabaddi) this tournament will be commenced from 13th to 20th March 2023. The event will take place in Dhaka, Bangladesh. A total of 12 teams across several continents (Asia, Europe, Africa, and South America) are set to participate in the Bangabandu Kabaddi Cup.

Bangladesh are the previous champions of the Bangabandhu Cup (Kabaddi). They won the title for the 2nd time in 2022, defeating Kenya in the final.

Participating nations

Venues

The all games were played at the following venues.
Shaheed Noor Hossain National Volleyball Stadium, Palton, Dhaka.

Group stage

Group A

Group B

Knockout stage

Semi-Finals

Final

Broadcasting 
T Sports served as host broadcaster of the tournament. And, Bangladesh Kabaddi Federation will broadcast all matches on YouTube & Facebook.

Television

References 

Kabaddi in Bangladesh
Kabaddi competitions